Julian Edwin Levi (1900–1982) was an American painter. He was a 1968 Resident of the American Academy in Rome. He should not be confused with the New York art dealer Julien Levy, who introduced Salvador Dalí to American patrons at his Julien Levy Gallery.

Life
He was born in Yorkville, New York. He grew up in Philadelphia. He studied at the Pennsylvania Academy of the Fine Arts.  He was a member of the Federal Art Project.

He taught at the Art Students League of New York, New School, and Pennsylvania Academy of the Fine Arts.

His work is held by the Museum of Modern Art, and the Society for Contemporary Art.
His papers are held at the Archives of American Art. He was elected into the National Academy of Design in 1973 as an Associate member and became a full Academician in 1976.

References

External links
Oral history interview with Julian E. Levi, Oct. - Dec. 1968
Flowers in a Glass, 1929 watercolor
Works by Julian E. Levy at Artfact
Works by Julian E. Levy at Artnet.com

1900 births
1982 deaths
20th-century American painters
American male painters
Artists from Philadelphia
Pennsylvania Academy of the Fine Arts alumni
Pennsylvania Academy of the Fine Arts faculty
Art Students League of New York faculty
The New School faculty
Federal Art Project artists
20th-century American male artists